Pediese, alt. Petiese, Peteese or Padiiset, was the name of a number of high ancient Egyptian officials and noblemen during the first millennium BCE, usually of Libyan descent.

 Pediese (prince in Athribis), around 720s BCE
 Pediese, chief of the Ma and High Priest of Ptah
 Pediese, author of the "Petition of Pediese"
 Pediese, son of Apy, known from a statue usurped by him